Sean Yazbeck is a British businessman.  He is the winner of the fifth season of Donald Trump's reality show, The Apprentice.  He is the Founder and CEO of an Inc. 500 Fastest Growing Company in America.  He is the benefactor of 'The Sean Yazbeck Centre for Digital Innovation' at Solent University, a learning centre for BSc, MSc and PhD degrees.

Business 
Yazbeck has multiple business interests in technology. He worked with Donald Trump to build the $500 million, five-star hotel, Trump SoHo in New York City.  He later founded the technology services company, Wavsys  which in 2014 was named an 'Inc. 500 Fastest Growing Company in America', with over $100 million per annum in revenue and employing more than 500 employees. In 2018, The Wall Street Journal reported that Yazbeck's Industry 4.0 digitisation software platform, Scopeworker signed a multi-billion dollar deal with the Sprint Corporation to automate the supplier services for their 5G network build.

Personal life 
Yazbeck was born in the Royal Borough of Kensington and Chelsea in London. He attended William Ellis School in Highgate, London. He graduated from Solent University in Southampton with a First Class Honors Degree.  He later received an Honorary Doctorate (PhD h.c.) of Business from Solent University where he is also a visiting lecturer. He is the benefactor of The Sean Yazbeck Centre for Digital Innovation at Solent University, a learning centre for BSc, MSc and PhD degrees. He opened the centre with Solent University's Chairman Theo Paphitis in July 2019.  In 2014, he was awarded the 'Entrepreneur of The Year Award' at the Business Innovation Awards Gala hosted by BritWeek and the British Government's, Department for International Trade (previously UKTI).  Yazbeck lives in Miami Beach, Florida. He was awarded the EB-1 visa green card for "persons of extraordinary ability". He plays polo for the Grand Champions Polo Club in Palm Beach, Florida and is a member of The Young Presidents' Organization (YPO), a global network of young chief executives. In 2008, in reference to his charity work with Voices for America's Children, the Governor of Kentucky, Steve Beshear, bestowed the honorary title of Kentucky Colonel on Yazbeck, "in recognition of noteworthy accomplishments and outstanding service to the nation."  In 2006, the then Mayor of Miami-Dade County, Florida, Carlos Álvarez (mayor), proclaimed 20 June as "Sean Yazbeck Day" in Miami-Dade County.  In 2014, Haute Living named Yazbeck "one of Miami's most eligible bachelors".

The Apprentice season 5 
Yazbeck and Piers Morgan are the only non-Americans to have won Donald Trump's The Apprentice.  Both are British.   Yazbeck was selected to appear on The Apprentice because he had been awarded the EB-1 visa green card for "persons of extraordinary ability". He won more tasks than any other Apprentice candidate and remained unbeaten as Project Manager over the 18 weeks.  He was chosen by Trump to be the winner during the show's live finale in Los Angeles.  According to Trump, Yazbeck overwhelmingly won the national vote, the first ever conducted for an Apprentice finale.   In the final task, Yazbeck was chosen to oversee a Barenaked Ladies charity concert, sponsored by Pontiac, to benefit the World Wildlife Fund. For winning the final task and being hired as Trump's Apprentice, Yazbeck chose to oversee the Trump SoHo project, with a one-year contract exceeding $250,000. He was also given a new Pontiac G6 hardtop convertible, mirroring Kendra Todd's reward of a Pontiac Solstice.  Yazbeck returned as a boardroom judge on The Apprentice 6 (2007), and hosted his own show, Reality Trailblazers, on the TV Guide Channel. He also appeared on Miss Universe (as a judge), Live with Regis and Kelly, MTV Video Music Awards, 1 vs. 100, Soap Talk, Identity and MTV's From G's to Gents.

References

External links 
 
 The Apprentice Yahoo! Bio
 The Apprentice NBC Bio
 
 The Apprentice – Where Are They Now? at NBC.com

Living people
Businesspeople from London
British chief executives
Alumni of Solent University
People educated at William Ellis School
British expatriates in the United States
Businesspeople from New York City
The Trump Organization employees
21st-century British businesspeople
21st-century American businesspeople
British telecommunications industry businesspeople
British construction businesspeople
British real estate businesspeople
British business executives
Year of birth missing (living people)
The Apprentice (franchise) winners
Participants in American reality television series